This is a chronological list of important Tibetan writers.

7th-10th century

11th century

12th century

13th century

14th century

15th century

16th century

17th century

18th century

19th century

20th century

20th century (cont. alphabetically)

Foreign writers with Tibetan names

See also
 Derge Parkhang
 Sa'gya library

References 

Lists of writers by nationality
Tibetan writers